Champagne Pool is a prominent geothermal feature within the Waiotapu geothermal area in the North Island of New Zealand. The name Champagne Pool is derived from the abundant efflux of carbon dioxide (CO2), similar to a glass of bubbling champagne. The hot spring was formed 900 years ago by a hydrothermal eruption, which makes it in geological terms a relatively young system.

Hydrochemistry

The pH of 5.5 is relatively constant due to buffering by the flux of CO2. Gases are mainly CO2, but to lesser extent nitrogen (N2), methane (CH4), hydrogen (H2), hydrogen sulphide (H2S), and traces of oxygen (O2). The siliceous geothermal fluid is oversaturated with metalloid compounds such as orpiment (As2S3) and stibnite (Sb2S3), which precipitate and form orange subaqueous deposits. The colourful deposits are in sharp contrast to the grey-white silica sinter surrounding Champagne Pool.

Biology

Although Champagne Pool is geochemically well characterised, few studies have addressed its role as a potential habitat for microbial life forms. H2 and either CO2 or O2 would be available as metabolic energy sources for autotrophic growth of methanogenic or hydrogen-oxidising microorganisms. Culture-independent methods provided evidence for filamentous, coccoid, and rod-shaped cell morphologies in the hot spring. Two novel bacteria and a novel archaeon have been successfully isolated from Champagne Pool. Bacterial isolate CP.B2 named Venenivibrio stagnispumantis tolerates relatively high concentrations of arsenic and antimony compounds and represents a novel genus and species within the order Aquificales.

See also
Hot springs in New Zealand

References

External links

Hot springs of New Zealand
Okataina Volcanic Centre
Lakes of Waikato